The Sheriff of Nottingham was historically the office responsible for enforcing law and order in Nottingham and bringing criminals to justice. For years the post has been directly appointed by the Lord Mayor of Nottingham and in modern times, with the existence of the police force, the position is entirely ceremonial and sustained to boost tourism due to the legendary connection with the fictional Sheriff of Nottingham in the tales of Robin Hood. However the historical position goes back to Anglo-Saxon times. The office is sometimes confused with that of the High Sheriff of Nottinghamshire (that office had previously existed, from 1068 until 1568, as High Sheriff of Nottinghamshire, Derbyshire and the Royal Forests).

Historical 
Responsibility for enforcing the law and keeping the peace in Anglo-Saxon England fell to the sheriff or shire-reeve (which is a contraction of the Old English word for county and reeve or greave). Different types of reeves attested before the Conquest include the high-reeve, town-reeve, port-reeve, shire-reeve (predecessor to the sheriff), reeve of the hundred and the reeve in charge of a manor, its post-conquest meaning.  England in the early 11th century employed the services of shire reeves to assist in the detection and prevention of crimes. Groups of 10 families or "tithings" under a hundredman (later constable) could call upon them. The reeve of an entire shire was a shire-reeve, predecessor to the sheriff.

After the Norman Conquest, specific counties appointed sheriffs to enforce the law (such as Yorkshire for example), although sometimes the duties of these sheriffs would cross the border of their respective counties. Nottingham would have come under the "High Sheriff of Nottinghamshire and Derbyshire" after the Norman Conquest.

The Sheriff during the reign of King John was Philip Marc. Marc was so unpopular that he was specifically mentioned in Magna Carta, which demanded his removal.

The first Sheriffs of Nottingham
In 1449, the city of Nottingham itself appointed its own sheriff for the first time (although the post was held simultaneously between two men, William Sadler and Thomas Lyng). The sheriffs at that time may have been responsible for "the delivery of prisoners to the courts, the collection of rents and taxes and generally keeping the 'King's Peace'".

From 1450 until 1835, the office was shared between two people, one of whom may have been chosen by the Mayor, the other by the town council. The reversion to a single sheriff was explained by the mayor and aldermen of Lincoln as "Local Government changes" (possibly the Municipal Corporations Act 1835).

Present sheriff 

The Sheriff of Nottingham for 2021/22 was Councillor Merlita Bryan.

Past sheriffs 
The office is considered largely ceremonial, expected to attend local events when the monarch is present and promoting the city in tourism and business. There are interviews with Joan Casson, John Hartshorne and Leon Unczur all recent sheriffs, describing the role of the present-day Sheriff of Nottingham. There have been seven female sheriffs, the first being in 1931. The most recent is Councillor Catharine Arnold.

List of sheriffs

15th Century

1449/50 William Sadler / Thomas Lyng
1450/51 John Clarke / Richard Bedal
1451/52 John Jowett / John Chaloner
1452/53 Robert Polson / John Holyock
1453/54 Thomas Bradmore / Thomas Smith
1454/55 Thomas Lovatt / Robert Shewood
1455/56 John Peringon / Henry Fisher
1456/57 William Strelly / Richard Hanson
1457/58 Ralph Hall / Henry Higyn
1458/59 No known names
1460/61 Hugh Smith / Thomas Garner
1461/62 John Ody / John Hyne
1462/63 John Mapperley / Roger Hewson
1463/64 Richard Knight / Walter Hilton
1458/59 No known names
1465/66 Richard Ody / John Hardy
1466/67 Richard Burton / John Taverner
1467/68 John Cooke / John Draper
1468/69 Robert Hanson / William Bithway
1469/70 William Barnes / Thomas Woodhouse
1472/73 Thomas Kendal / Richard Mellor
1473/74 John Gotham / John Holyock
1475/76 John Hilton / William Skevyngton
1476/77 William Allyn / John Cowper
1477/78 Walter Watnall / William Hurst
1478/79 Robert Ratcliffe / John Wederley
1479/80 John Clarke / John Alred
1480/81 John Cost / John Wood
1481/82 Thomas Cost / Ralph Hill
1482/83 John Howitt / William Johnson
1483/84 John Mellor / John Burton
1484/85 Thomas Ball / Edward Hilton
1485/86 John Bolton / John Williamson
1486/87 John Turner / William Wright
1487/88 Edmund Milnes / John Sergeant
1488/89 Richard Pyckard / Richard Fisher
1489/90 Richard Essett / Thomas Balderby
1490/91 Thomas Watt / William Congerton
1491/92 Richard Clough / Thomas Clifton
1492/93 Thomas Williamson / William Shirley
1493/94 Robert Coytus / John Pyerson
1494/95 Robert Toft / John Webster
1495/96 John Shaw / Christopher Pickard
1496/97 John Cost / Alexander Elvington
1497/98 John Walton / Alexander Elvington
1498/99 Robert Norwood / Henry Hobbes
1499/1500 William Turner / William Benbow

16th Century

1500/01 Thomas Camworth / John Town
1501/02 John Wilkinson (mayor 1517) / John Fisher
1502/03 John Rose / Thomas Willoughby (mayor 1518)
1503/04 Henry Plumptre / Ranulph Bulkley
1504/05 Nicholas Rodes / James Brasenby
1505/06 William Kirkby (mayor 1523) / William Johnson
1506/07 Richard Caunt / Richard Halton
1507/08 John Hames / Thomas Stables
1507/09 Thomas the Curren
1508/09 William Cost / Thomas Wass
1509/10 William Hegyn / Thomas Mellers (mayor 1529)
1510/11 Thomas Cockayne / William Parmaton (mayor 1527, 1534)
1511/12 Robert Mellers / Thomas Morton
1512/13 Henry Cost / Robert Shemald
1513/14 Richard Lister / Robert Fisher
1514/15 John Doubleday / John Dorand
1515/16 John Yates / Richard Stanley
1516/17 Richard Selyoke / Thomas Hunt
1517/18 Robert Hesilrig (mayor 1539) / Henry Green
1518/19 Robert Rossel / Robert Stables
1519/20 John Alynson (mayor 1540) / Thomas Meryel
1520/21 William Holden / Hugh Oldham
1521/22 Thomas Dokker / Ralph Palmer
1522/23 Robert Lovatt / Robert Moody
1523/24 Thomas Hobbes / Robert Nedham
1524/25 William Warner / Thomas Harpham
1525/26 Henry Shepherd / William Sherpington
1526/27 William Colville / Robert Elton
1527/28 Thomas Gregory / Thomas Dawson (mayor 1547)
1528/29 Richard Richardson / Laurence Wirehorn
1529/30 James Mason / Robert Clattercoats
1530/31 Richard Willoughby / Anthony Garland
1531/32 William Clattercoats / Richard Nedham
1532/33 William Edmondson / Laurence Marriott
1533/34 William Mellers / Randell Bland
1534/35 Humphrey Quernby (mayor 1549) / William Coke
1535/36 Thomas Cockayne / John Smith
1536/37 Richard Bunting / John Collinson
1537/38 John Revell / Thomas Wallis
1538/39 Richard Kyte / John Newbold
1539/40 Robert Freeman / Christopher Stocks
1540/41 Richard Crewe / John Sladen
1541/42 Humphry Byrd / William Foster
1542/43 John Haskett / Nicholas Bonner (mayor 1559, 1565)
1543/44 Henry Wincell / Henry Fosbrooke (mayor 1560, 1566)
1544/45 Richard Alyson / Richard Burton
1545/46 John English / William Goodwin
1546/47 Robert Cockayne / Robert Stanley
1547/48 John Stanley / Edward Crewe
1548/49 John Simpson / John Presse
1549/50 Randolph Glossop / John Gregory (mayor 1561)
1550/51 John Nix / Nicholas Gorstan
1551/52 John Alcocke / John Brownley (mayor 1567)
1552/53 John Elton / Edward Newton
1553/54 John Collin / Walter Dawson
1554/55 Edward Edmundson / Richard Askew
1555/56 Francis Colman / William Gelstrop (mayor 1583, 1590)
1556/57 Hugh Smith / Mathew Hallam
1557/58 Peter Clarke (mayor 1591, 1597) / Robert Burton
1558/59 Henry Dand / Robert Alvey (mayor 1580, 1587, 1594)
1559/60 William Wilson / Thomas Clarke
1560/61 Richard James (mayor 1577) / Thomas Kettering
1561/62 Richard Welsh / James Rawlinson
1562/63 William Ball / Gilbert Scale
1563/64 Robert Jepson / John Parr
1564/65 Thomas Atkinson / George Rotherham
1565/66 Simon Wilson / Robert Marsh
1566/67 William Scott / Henry Sherwood
1567/68 James Hartley / John Townrow
1568/69 Thomas Barwell / Fabian Mellers
1569/70 Thomas Nix / William Glossop
1570/71 Thomas Cadman / William Stansal
1571/72 Robert Cowper / Richard Morhag (mayor 1596, 1603, 1610)
1572/73 William Dodgson / Roger Wood
1573/74 Michael Bell / Henry Brightmore
1574/75 Robert Phipps / William Parlby
1575/76 Nicholas Alvey / William Bell
1576/77 Edmund Burton / Thomas Donycliffe
1577/78 Humphrey Bonner (mayor 1600, 1607) / George Hutchinson
1578/79 George Widdowson / George Curzon
1579/80 Thomas Reeve / Richard Tomlinson
1580/81 Robert York / Simon Pyckard
1581/82 William Pyggin / Roger Wood
1582/83 William Greaves  / Richard Hurt (mayor 1602)
1583/84 Robert Smales / Robert Hallam
1584/85 Thomas Huthwaite / Anker Jackson (mayor 1598, 1605, 1612)
1585/86 John Hall / Thomas Wallis
1586/87 Hezekiah Newbold / Henry Dunne
1587/88 John Nodin / Nicholas Sherwin
1588/89 Edward Goodwin / Robert Stables (mayor 1601, 1608)
1589/90 Richard Parleby / Ralph Shaw
1590/91 William Freeman (mayor 1606, 1613) / Nicholas Baguley
1591/92 Edmund Jowett / Leonard Nix (mayor 1617, 1624, 1631)
1592/93 Richard Johnson / Richard Welsh (mayor 1604, 1611)
1593/94 Thomas Drury / Richard Reckless
1594/95 James Martin / William Widdowson
1595/96 William Langford / William Wilson
1596/97 William Kniveton / George Stokely
1597/98 John Scott / William Pinder
1598/99 Francis Rolleston / Henry Alvey
1599/1600 James Hobson / Richard Parker

17th century

1600/01 James Woolfe / John Parker
1601/02 Thomas Hill / Marmaduke Gregory (mayor 1620)
1602/03 Robert Sherwin / James Rotherham
1603/04 William Littlefare / William Hynde
1604/05 Thomas Nix (mayor 1616) / Robert Parker (mayor 1626, 1633)
1605/06 Robert Freeman / Anthony Gamble
1606/07 Richard Reckless / George Riley
1607/08 Thomas Morley / Richard Heald
1608/09 Nicholas Sherwin / John Dalton
1609/10 James Seeley / Richard Hare
1610/11 Lewis Oxley / Stephen Hill
1611/12 George Walker / Henry Baguley
1612/13 William Clark / Pervcival Millington
1613/14 Richard Jowett / John Alvey
1614/15 John Perry / William Ludlam
1615/16 William Ricket / William Hunt
1616/17 Samuel Burrows / William Hunt
1617/18 Michael Cook / Hugh Verden
1618/19 William Gregory / John James
1619/20 Nicholas Mastyn / William Nix
1620/21 Robert Briggs / Edward Morris
1621/22 Gabriel Bateman / Cuthbert Weyn
1622/23 William Parker / Roger Darbyshire
1623/24 William Hopkins / William Lupton
1624/25 Thomas Cook / William Littlefare Jnr.
1625/26 Richard Cowlishaw / John Dodsley
1626/27 William Stanley / Robert Egginton
1627/28 Alexander Staples / Robert Greaves
1628/29 Richard Hardmett (mayor 1635, 1642) / Robert Harris
1629/30 Edward Richards / John Poynton
1630/31 Richard Dring / William Frost
1631/32 Francis Toplady (mayor 1653, 1660) / Richard Hare
1632/33 Gabriel Groves / James Beardsley
1633/34 Edmund Bampton / William Watson
1635/36 William Richards / William Drury (mayor 1640)
1636/37 Thomas Wooley / Richard Turpin
1637/38 Thomas Malin / Henry Miller
1638/39 Joseph Winfield / Thomas Jackson
1639/40 Henry James / Thomas Gamble
1640/41 John Cooper / William Parker
1641/42 John Sherwin / William Sumner
1642/43 John Tomlin / George Alsebrooke
1643/44 Richard Hides / Paul Hooton
1644/45 Thomas Smith / William Bailey
1645/46 John Fillingham / Adrian Garner
1646/47 John Parker / Thomas Huthwaite
1647/48 Richard Whitby / William Riley
1648/49 Thomas Green / Robert Smith
1649/50 John Reckless / Richard Watkinson
1650/51 Joshuah Hill / William Hall
1651/52 Edmund Richards / Robert Malin
1652/53 Robert Saxon / Barnaby Wartnaby
1653/54 Thomas Cooper / Brownlow Eggington
1654/55 Daniel Sulley / Francis Cooke
1655/56 Roger Riley / Richard Smith
1656/57 Richard Crampton / John Smalley
1657/58 William Petty / William Lealand
1658/59 William Parker / John Toplady
1659/60 Isaac Malin / William Drury
1660/61 Samuel Riley / Adrian Cooke
1661/62 Richard Hodgkin / William Burton
(superseded by Edward / Greaves)
1662/63 William Toplady / John Greaves
1663/64 Christopher Hall / Gervase Rippon
1664/65 Robert Bate / William Ashers
1665/66 William Sheppard / John Parker
1666/67 Thomas Walker / Roger Riley
1667/68 Robert Kirkby / John Rawson
1668/69 Joseph Clay / Edward White
1669/70 Gervase Wyld* / Samuel Richards*
1670/71 Benjamin Riccards / Ralph Bennet
1671/72 Arthur Riccards / William White
1672/73 Richard Smith / Robert Coulstone
1673/74 William Wilde / John Parker
1674/75 Samuel Smith / Francis Salmon
1675/76 Hugh Walker / Adrian Gamble
1676/77 Thomas Muxlow / Robert Wortley
1677/78 William Coulton / Harold Smyth
1678/79 William Hardy / Robert Hewitt
1679/80 William Woolhouse / Francis Sumners
1680/81 John Sherwin / Samuel Lealand
1681/82 Robert Green / John Malin
1682/83 Robert Peach / John Whitby
1683/84 John Peak / John Huthwaite
1684/85 Thomas Le / John Shipman
1685/86 William Jackson / John Unwin
1686/87 Henry Hardy / Thomas Partridge
1687/88 John Scattergood / Richard Wright
1688/89 Thomas Boote / Samuel Smith
1689/90 Samuel Watkinson / William Cockle
1690/91 William Orme / William Barnes
1691/92 James Huthwaite / Benjamin Green
1692/93 John Hoe / Edward Hickling
1693/94 Samuel Smith / Francis Armstrong
1694/95 John Kitchen / William Barke
1695/96 Roger Radford / Robert Lindley
1696/97 Robert Harrison / John Greaves
1697/98 Thomas James / Robert Allcock
1698/99 Thomas Lovett / John Riccards
1699/1700 Francis Metham / George Frith

18th Century

1700/01 Joseph Cooke / William Bilby
1701/02 Richard Bearn (mayor 1719, 1725) / Alexander Burden
1702/03 John Reynolds / John Collin
1703/04 William Greaves / Theodore Fosbrooke
1704/05 William Johnson / Thomas Hawkesley (mayor 1715)
1705/06 William Drury (mayor 1707)/ Robert Brentnall
1706/07 William Rippon / Francis Smith
1707/08 Lionel Lamb / Thomas White
1708/09 Jacob Tibson / Thomas Fillingham
1709/10 Alvery Dodsley / Matthew Hoyland
1710/11 Robert Hoyes / Thomas Trigge (mayor 1717, 1723)
1711/12 John Sherwin / John Sweetapple
1712/13 Gervase Pilkinton / Joseph Hemus
1713/14 John Huthwaite (mayor 1732) / Bartholomew Hallam
1714/15 Marmaduke Pennell (mayor 1718, 1724) / William Trigge (mayor 1730, 1748)
1715/16 John Newton / William Shepherd
1716/17 Robert Egginton / Laurence Bourne
1717/18 John Radforth / Joseph Walters
1718/19 Jonathon Truman / Richard Smith
1719/20 William Garton / Samuel Poe
1720/21 William Robinson / Edmund Wildbore
1721/22 John Burton / Robert Egginton
1722/23 James Hoe / James Huthwaite
1723/24 Nathaniel Charnels / John Hornbuckle (1743, 1749, 1754)
1724/25 Samuel Harris / John Poe
1725/26 John Morley / William Bilbie Jnr.
1726/27 Richard Wheldon / Roger Radforth
1727/28 John Farnhill / Joseph Inglesant
1728/29 Jonathon Truman Jnr. / Henry Butler
1729/30 John Wood / Samuel Fellows
1730/31 Stephen Egginton / Cornelius Huthwaite (mayor 1757, 1763, 1771)
1731/32 John Foxcroft / John Bilbie
1732/33 Thomas Langford (mayor 1733, 1747, 1753, 1759)/ Lewis Sherwin
1733/34 Isaac Wyld (mayor 1759) / Joseph Finch
1734/35 Francis Parkin / Joseph Smith
1735/36 Joseph Wright / Joseph Bilbie
1736/37 James Dymock / Robert Huish (mayor 1760)
1737/38 Charles Morley / James Hornbuckle (mayor 1761, 1767)
1738/39 Thomas Shaw / Joseph Wright
1739/40 Humphrey Hollins (mayor 1762) / Samuel Wood
1740/41 William Cooper (mayor 1765) / John Sherbrooke
1741/42 Alexander Burden / Benjamin Bull
1742/43 James Huthwaite Jnr. / Robie Swann (mayor 1766)
1743/44 William Goodwin / William Foulds
1744/45 John Killingley / Thomas Haywood
1745/46 John Oldknow / John Sands
1746/47 Thomas Cotes / Thomas Oldknow
1747/48 John Plumptre / William Cotton
1748/49 John Egginton / Humphrey Cox
1749/50 Benjamin Mather / Richard Butler
1750/51 Johnathon Dodson / William Seagrave
1751/52 Thomas Worthington / John Caruthers
1752/53 John Blackwell / Thomas Spilby
1753/54 John Fellows / Thomas Sands
1754/55 William Huthwaite / Robert Seagrave
1755/56 John Mellie / John Inglesant
1756/57 Mark Huish / Alexander Foxcroft
1757/58 John Wilson / Robert Foulds
1758/59 Robert Hall / John Wells
1759/60 John Foxcroft / Joseph Stubbins
1760/61 James Foxcroft / George Dodson
1761/62 John Padley / William Howitt
1762/63 Benjamin Foxcroft / Matthew Whitlock
1763/64 Isaac Wylde / Joseph Lowe
1764/65 Benjamin Hornbuckle / John Sands
1765/66 William Bettison / Benjamin Mather
1766/67 John Doncaster / William Smith
1767/68 Henry Hollins / George Sands
1768/69 Thomas Oldknow Jnr. / Michael Kayes
1769/70 Joseph Heath / Joseph Oldknow
1770/71 Samuel Eaton / John Oldknow
1771/72 William Wells / Henry Green
1772/73 John Wells / Richard Cox
1773/74 George Burbage / John Collishaw
1774/75 Ralph Newman / William Heath
1775/76 Edward Chatteris / Samuel Newham
1776/77 Smith Churchill / Tertius Dale
1777/78 Sir George Smith, Bt / Samuel Statham
1778/79 Samuel Heywood / Robert Summers
1779/80 Samuel Worthington / Samuel Green
1780/81 John Buxton / John Ball Mason
1781/82 John Fellows (mayor 1790) / John Hancock
1782/83 Thomas Caunt (mayor 1794) / Thomas Watson
1783/84 Henry Keyworth / John Need
1784/85 Edward Swann / Alexander Strahan
1785/86 John Heath / George Dodson Jnr.
1786/87 Stokeham Huthwaite / Thomas Hawkesley
1787/88 John Davison / Thomas Nelson
1788/89 Timothy Fellows / William Huthwaite Jnr.
1789/90 Joseph Hurst Lowe / Joseph Heath
1790/91 John Whitlock / Ehlm Samuel Fellows
1791/92 William Doncaster / John Stone
1792/93 Thomas Wylde / Thomas Pepper
1793/94 Nathaniel Whitlock / Thomas Smith
1794/95 Thomas Richards / Henry Green Jnr.
1795/96 John Allen / John Ashwell
1796/97 Thomas Richards / Nathaniel Need Jnr.
1797/98 Cornelius Huthwaite / William Dawson 
1798/99 Wright Coldhan / William Wilson
1799/1800 Robert Hall / Jonathan Dunn

19th Century

1800/01 George Nelson / Henry Enfield
1801/02 John Allen / Thomas White
1802/03 William Howitt (mayor 1808) / William Hickling
1803/04 George Nelson / Thomas Williams
1804/05 Charles Lomas Morley (mayor 1815, 1821) / John Houseman Barber (mayor 1817)
1805/06 Charles Mellor / Edward Stavely
1806/07 Octavius Thomas Oldknow (mayor 1822)/ Alexander Strahan
1807/08 John Bates / Wright Coldham (mayor 1809)
1808/09 John Carr / Francis Wakefield Jnr.
1809/10 Kirk Swann / William Morley
1810/11 Charles Wakefield / John Stevens Howitt
1811/12 Isaac Woolley (mayor 1818)/ Samuel Hall
1812/13 Edward Allatt Swann / Alfred Joseph Lowe
1813/14 Charles Lomas Morley / John Michael Fellows
1814/15 John Allen Jnr. / William Soars (mayor 1819)
1815/16 Richard Hopper Jnr. / Thomas Wakefield
1816/17 George Gill / Roger Allen
1817/18 A.T. Fellows  / C. Huish
1818/19 N. Barnsdall  / John Theaker
1819/20 C. Huish / Mr. Deverills
1820/21 Robert Seals / J. Heard
1821/22 J. Heard  / W. Rowarth
1822/23 J. Wells  / T. Wilson
1823/24 Henry Leaver / Thomas Guildford
1824/25 F. Hart / James Fellows
1825/26 William Walker / S. H. Swann
1821/22 J. Heard  / W. Rowarth
1822/23 J. Wells  / T. Wilson
1823/24 Henry Leaver / Thomas Guildford
1824/25 F. Hart / James Fellows
1825/26 William Walker / S. H. Swann
1826/27 William Enfield / Thomas Shipman
1827/28 Samuel Hollins / Kirke Swann
1828/29 Nathaniel Barnsdall / Henry Homer
1829/30 William Cartledge / R. Davison
1830/31 T. Allen  / R. C. Barber
1831/32 John Harrison / T. Guildford
1832/33 George Harvey / John Rogers
1833/34 Thomas Roberts / T. Bishop
1834/35 Charles Leavers / John Birkhead
1835/36 Henry Moses Wood
1836/37 George Bacon
1837/38 Benjamin Morley
1838/39 Francis Butcher Gill
1839/40 Johnathon Neville
1840/41 Thomas Roberts Jnr.
1841/42 Thomas Gilbert Carver (mayor 1848)
1842/43 Jonathon Reckless (mayor 1853)
1843/44 William Galloway
1844/45 William Knight
1845/46 Nathan Hurst Jnr.
1846/47 John Barber
1847/48 James Roe
1848/49 Edward Steegman
1849/50 Thomas Ashwell
1850/51 S. Wilmot
1851/52 T. Ball
1852/53 W. Page
1853/54 Anthony John Mundella
1854/55 W. V. Copeland
1855/56 F. E. Shipley
1856/57 C. Felkin
1857/58 W. Bradbury
1858/59 John Manning (mayor 1870)
1859/60 William G. Ward (mayor 1871)
1860/61 William Lambert (mayor 1874)
1865/66 R. B. Bond
1866/67 M. I. Preston
1867/68 G. C. Hill
1868/69 G. C. Hill
1869/70 John W. Bowers (mayor 1876)
1870/71 J. G. Woodward
1871/72 C. A. Boot
1872/73 G. Trevitt
1873/74 James Carver
1874/75 William Sulley
1875/76 John Renals (mayor 1888)
1876/77 Leonard Lindley (mayor 1882)
1877/78 Alfred J.Jacoby
1878/79 John Turney (mayor 1886/87)
1879/80 Frederick Acton
1880/81 H. S. Cropper
1881/82 T. Bayley
1882/83 J. P. Ford
1883/84 F. F. Cleaver
1884/85 Edward Henry Fraser (mayor 1896/97)
1885/86 John Benjamin Walker
1886/87 Robert Dennett
1887/88 John Jelly
1888/89 John Robinson
1889/90 Frederick Pullman
1890/91 Anderson Brownsword
1891/92 John Alfred H. Green (mayor 1906)
1892/93 Abraham Pyatt
1893/94 Joseph Bright (mayor 1894/95, 1904)
1894/95 Forbes R. Mutch
1895/96 John Bright
1896/97 Frederick R. Radford
1897/98 Arthur William Black
1898/99 Frederick W. Gregory
1899/1900 James Black Roberts

20th century

1900/01 James Brown Sim
1901/02 Edward G. Loverseed
1902/03 John White
1903/04 Robert Fleeman
1904/05 Thomas James Dabell
1905/06 Samborne Cook
1906/07 Frederick Ball
1907/08 William Henry Carey
1908/09 Edwin Mellor
1909/10 Thomas Ward
1910/11 Frank Newton Hobson/ Albert Reuben Atkey (Lord Mayor 1928)
1911/12 John Pycroft
1912/13 Harry Baker Halford
1913/14 John Henry Gregg
1914/15 John Godfrey Small
1915/16 James Clarkson
1916/17 Richard Henry Swain
1917/18 Henry Offiler
1918/19 John Morris
1919/20 Herbert Offiler
1920/21 John H. Freckingham
1921/22 Abraham Parkes
1922/23 John Farr (Lord Mayor 1933)
1923/24 Arthur Judd
1924/25 Robert A. Young
1925/26 Samuel Geo. Ward
1926/27 John Hopkin
1927/28 Arthur Pollard (Lord Mayor 1930)
1928/29 William Green (Lord Mayor 1931)
1929/30 William Hooley (Lord Mayor 1937)
1930/31 Richard E. Ashworth (Lord Mayor 1934)
1931/32 Mrs. C. M. Harper
1932/33 William Walter Weldon
1933/34 Ernest Purser (Lord Mayor 1936)
1934/35 Wallis Smith
1935/36 Frederick Mitchell (Lord Mayor 1943)
1936/37 Arthur E. Savage
1937/38 Walter Halls (Lord Mayor 1940)
1938/39 Louis Pilsworth (Lord Mayor 1941)
1939/40 Ernest A. Braddock (Lord Mayor 1942)
1940/41 Lazarus J. Levin
1941/42 A. H. Billingham
1942/43 John E. Mitchell (Lord Mayor 1947/48)
1943/44 Francis Carney (Lord Mayor 1944)
1944/45 Wilfred B. Blandy
1945/46 Thomas R. Scott
1946/47 Harry O. Emmony (Lord Mayor 1950)
1947/48 William Sharp (Lord Mayor 1949)
1948/49 William Sharp
1949 Joseph Littlefair (Died)
1949/50 Leon Willson (Lord Mayor 1952)
1950/51 Walter Murby
1951/52 Sidney Hobson (Lord Mayor 1954)
1952/53 John W. Kenyon (Lord Mayor 1959)
1953/54 William J. Cox (Lord Mayor 1956)
1954/55 Leonard Mitson (Lord Mayor 1955)
1955/56 William E. Maltby
1956/57 Roland E. Green (Lord Mayor 1960)
1957/58 John L. Davies (Lord Mayor 1961)
1958/59 Frank W. Wootton (Lord Mayor 1964)
1959/60 Sidney P. Hill (Lord Mayor 1962)
1960/61 Cornelius Cameron (Lord Mayor 1963)
1961/62 A. E. Greenaway
1962/63 Arthur William Norwebb
1963/64 Percy Holland (Lord Mayor 1966)
1964/65 William George Ernest Dyer (Lord Mayor 1969)
1965/66 C. McReed
1966/67 E. M. Durham
1967/68 Mr. J. H. Bryan
1956/69 B. W. Goddard
1969/70 L. Whitehouse
1970/71 C. W. Judge
1971/72 Edwin Bernard Bateman (Lord Mayor 1977)
1972/73 Norman Hemmington
1973/74 Arthur G. Wright (Lord Mayor 1983)
1974/75 L. F. Squires
1975/76 G. H. Elliott
1976/77 Mrs. G. Roberts
1977/78 Rex Rolling
1978/79 Percy Holland
1979/80 George Howe
1980/81 Frank Dennett
1981/82 Frank Dennett
1982/83 Frank Dennett
1983/84 Frank Dennett
1984/85 Frank Dennett
1985/86 Frank Dennett
1986/87 Barrie Parker (Lord Mayor 1996)
1987/88 Royce Young
1988/89 B. A. Marshall
1989/90 A. F. Robinson
1990/91 Alfred T. Stone
1991/92 Shaukat Khan
1992/93 Brent Charlesworth (Lord Mayor 2003)
1993/94 A. F. Robinson
1994/95 R. McIntosh
1995/96 Roy Greensmith (Lord Mayor 1997, 2001)
1996/97 Malcolm A. Wood (Lord Mayor 1992)
1996/97 Mrs. S. Briggs
1997/98 A. F. Robinson
1998/99 Christopher Gibson (Lord Mayor 1990)
1999/2000 Mike Whittall

21st Century

2000/01 John Hartshorne (Lord Mayor 2004)
2001/02 Joan Casson
2002/03 Ali Asghar
2003/04 John Hartshorne   
2004/05 Derek Creswell
2005/06 Derek Creswell
2006/07 Jeannie Packer (Lord Mayor 2009)
2007/08 Jeannie Packer
2008/09 Brian Grocock (Lord Mayor 2010)
2009/10 Leon Unczur (Lord Mayor 2012)
2010/11 Penny Griggs
2011/12 Merlita Bryan (Lord Mayor 2013)
2013/14 Ian Malcolm (Lord Mayor 2014)
2014/15 Jackie Morris (Lord Mayor 2015)
2015/16 Mohammed Saghir 
2016/17 Jackie Morris
2017/18 Glyn Jenkins
2018/19 Catharine Arnold
2019/20 Patience Uloma Ifediora

References

Sheriff
Sheriff
Sheriff
Nottingham

nl:Sheriff van Nottingham
fi:Nottinghamin sheriffi
sv:Sheriffen av Nottingham